For the former Arkansas State University football coach, see John Bobo.

John Paul Bobo (February 14, 1943 – March 30, 1967) was a United States Marine Corps second lieutenant who posthumously received the Medal of Honor for heroism during the Vietnam War on March 30, 1967.

Biography
John Paul Bobo was born on February 14, 1943, in Niagara Falls, New York. He attended Bishop Duffy High School where he is today distinguished as an honored alum. He graduated from Niagara University in Niagara Falls, New York, in 1965.

US Marine Corps
Bobo enlisted in the U.S. Marine Corps Reserve on May 28, 1965, in Buffalo while attending Niagara University. He received a B.A. Degree in History in June 1965, and was commissioned a second lieutenant in the Marine Corps Reserve on December 17, 1965. He completed the Officer Candidate Course, The Basic School, Marine Corps Schools, Quantico, Virginia, in May 1966.

South Vietnam
Bobo was ordered to the Republic of Vietnam (South Vietnam) in June 1966 and was assigned duty as the Second Platoon commander, Company I, 3rd Battalion, 9th Marine Regiment, 3rd Marine Division. While serving in Company I, 9th Marines, during Operation Prairie III, he was mortally wounded when a large number of NVA soldiers attacked his rifle company's night ambush position (at Hill 70, west of Con Thien) in Quang Tri Province near the Demilitarized Zone in South Vietnam on March 30, 1967.  Knowing his wounds would prevent him from making it to safety, Bobo ordered his men to retreat while he stayed behind alone to fight the North Vietnamese aggressors.  His actions saved the lives of all of his men.  For this, he was posthumously awarded the Medal of Honor.

He was 24 years old.

Burial
He is buried in Gate of Heaven Cemetery in Lewiston, New York.

Military decorations and awards
2nd Lieutenant Bobo's military awards include:

Personal namings and honors

Lt. Bobo namings and honors include:
 The U.S. Navy has three classes of ships in its Marine Prepositioning Fleet —  the newest class, which were built by General Dynamics and delivered to Military Sealift Command in the mid-1980s, is named the 2nd Lt. John P. Bobo  Class.
Since 1985, the ship had been under long-term lease to Military Sealift Command from American Overseas Marine. On January 16, 2007, the Military Sealift Command purchased the  maritime prepositioning ship, USNS 2nd Lt. John P. Bobo.

 The Marine Corps Officer Candidate School, Marine Corps Base Quantico, Virginia, Officers Mess, is called Bobo Hall.
 John Bobo's name is memorialized on the Medal of Honor monument, Niagara Falls State Park.
 John Bobo's name is etched on the Vietnam Veterans Memorial, Panel 17E, Row 070.

Niagara University's baseball field is named, John P. Bobo Field.
The Marine Corps Security Forces Response facility at Naval Weapons Station Earle was dedicated to 2nd Lt. John Bobo.

Medal of Honor citation
The President of the United States in the name of The Congress takes pride in presenting the MEDAL OF HONOR posthumously to

for service as set forth in the following CITATION:

For conspicuous gallantry and  intrepidity at the risk of his life above and beyond the call of duty as Weapons Platoon Commander, Company I, Third Battalion, Ninth Marines, Third Marine Division, in Quang Tri Province, Republic of Vietnam, on 30 March 1967.  Company I was establishing night ambush sites when the command group was attacked by a reinforced North Vietnamese company supported by heavy automatic weapons and mortar fire.  Lieutenant BOBO immediately organized a hasty defense and moved from position to position encouraging the outnumbered Marines despite the murderous enemy fire.  Recovering a rocket launcher from among the friendly casualties, he organized a new launcher team and directed its fire into the enemy machine gun position.  When an exploding enemy mortar round severed Lieutenant Bobo's right leg below the knee, he refused to be evacuated and insisted upon being placed in a firing position to cover the movement of the command group to  a better location.  With a web belt around his leg serving as tourniquet and with his leg jammed into the dirt to curtail the bleeding, he remained in this position and delivered devastating fire into the ranks of the enemy attempting to overrun the Marines.  Lieutenant BOBO was mortally wounded while firing his weapon into the main point of the enemy attack but his valiant spirit inspired his men to heroic efforts, and his tenacious stand enabled the command group to gain a protective position where it repulsed the enemy onslaught.  Lieutenant BOBO's superb leadership, dauntless courage, and bold initiative reflected great credit upon himself and upheld the highest traditions of the Marine Corps and the United States Naval Service.  He gallantly gave his life for his country.
/S/LYNDON B. JOHNSON

See also

List of Medal of Honor recipients
List of Medal of Honor recipients for the Vietnam War

Notes

References

1943 births
1967 deaths
American military personnel killed in the Vietnam War
United States Marine Corps Medal of Honor recipients
Niagara University alumni
People from Niagara Falls, New York
5 Bobo, John P.
Recipients of the Gallantry Cross (Vietnam)
United States Marine Corps officers
United States Marine Corps reservists
Vietnam War recipients of the Medal of Honor
United States Marine Corps personnel of the Vietnam War